The Free Territory of Trieste was an independent territory in Southern Europe between northern Italy and Yugoslavia, facing the north part of the Adriatic Sea, under direct responsibility of the United Nations Security Council in the aftermath of World War II. For a period of seven years, it acted essentially as a free city.

The territory was established on 10 February 1947 by a protocol of the Treaty of Peace with Italy in order to accommodate an ethnically and culturally mixed population in a neutral independent country. The intention was also to cool down territorial claims between Italy and Yugoslavia, due to its strategic importance for trade with Central Europe. It came into existence on 15 September 1947. Its administration was divided into two areas: one being the port city of Trieste with a narrow coastal strip to the northwest (Zone A); the other (Zone B) was formed by a small portion of the north-western part of the Istrian peninsula.

The territory was dissolved de facto and given to Italy and Yugoslavia in 1954. This was formalized much later by the bilateral Treaty of Osimo of 1975, ratified in 1977.

Geography 

The Free Territory of Trieste comprised an area of  around the Bay of Trieste from Duino/Devin in the north to Novigrad/Cittanova in the south, and had approximately 330,000 inhabitants. It bordered the new Italian Republic to the north, and the Socialist Federal Republic of Yugoslavia to the south and to the east. The rivers of the territory included the Rižana/Risano, the Dragonja/Dragogna, the Timavo/Timava, the Val Rosandra/Glinščica, and the Mirna/Quieto. The Territory's highest point was at Monte Cocusso/Kokoš. Its most extreme points were near Medeazza/Medjavas at 45° 48’ in the north, at Tarski Zaliv / Porto Quieto at 45° 18’ in the south, Savudrija / Punta Salvore at 13° 29’ in the west, and Gročana/Grozzana at 13° 55’ in the east.

History

Since 1382, Trieste had been part of the Habsburg monarchy, whilst Istria had been divided for centuries between the Habsburg monarchy (its central, northern and eastern parts) and the Republic of Venice (its western and southern parts). The population of the territory has been diverse and mixed, with different and often changing ethnic majorities in different parts of the territory.
Italian-speakers have been predominant in most urban settlements and in the coast, with strong minorities of Slovenes, Serbs and Croats, especially in Trieste district, where Slovenes represented a third of the population by the end of World War I (most of them however were of recent arrivals, after 1880, from interior Slovene districts). The countryside of the territory was mostly Slovene or Croatian in the southernmost portion of the area. There was also a smaller number of Istro-Romanians, Greeks, Albanians and a strong Triestine Jewish community.

The Triestine dialect reflects this ethnic mix. Its base is derived from Venetian, influenced by an ancient Rhaeto-Romance substrate, mainly due to the existence of the now defunct Tergestine dialect.
Some of the Triestine words are of German and Slovene origin and also came from other languages, such as Greek.

The variations of spoken Slovenian and Serbo-Croatian in the territory were also largely dialectal, sharing words with the Triestine and Istrian dialects. In the southernmost part of the territory, the Croatian-based dialects are of the Chakavian type, while the Venetian-based Istrian is also commonly used.

At the end of World War I, Italy annexed Trieste, Istria and part of modern-day western Slovenia from Austria-Hungary, establishing the border region known as the Julian March (Venezia Giulia). In 1924, Italy annexed the Free State of Fiume, now the city of Rijeka in Croatia.

During the 1920s and 1930s, the Slavic population was subjected to forced Italianization and discrimination under the Italian fascist regime. They were also exposed to state violence by fascist party mobs, including the burning of the Slovene National Hall in Trieste on 13 July 1920, and also in other towns and villages. A few Slovenes and Croats consequentially emigrated to Yugoslavia, while some joined the TIGR resistance organization, whose methods included more than 100 acts of terrorism, mostly against the exponents of the Italian authorities in the region (especially in the provinces of Trieste and Gorizia).

World War II

Italy fought with Nazi Germany as an Axis power in World War II from 1940. When the Fascist regime collapsed in 1943 and Italy capitulated, the territory was occupied by German forces who created the Operational Zone of the Adriatic Littoral, the capital of which was Trieste. The Yugoslav 4th Army and the Slovenian 9th Corps entered Trieste on 1 May 1945, after a battle in the town of Opicina. The 2nd Division (New Zealand) arrived the next day and forced the surrender of the 2,000 German Army troops holding out in Trieste, who warily had refused to capitulate to Yugoslav troops, fearing they would be executed by them. An uneasy truce developed between New Zealand and Yugoslav troops occupying the area until British General Sir William Morgan proposed a partition of the territory and the removal of Yugoslav troops from the area occupied by the Allies. Yugoslav leader Josip Broz Tito agreed in principle on 23 May, as the British XIII Corps was moving forward to the proposed demarcation line. An agreement was signed in Duino on 10 June, creating the Morgan Line. The Yugoslav troops withdrew by 12 June 1945.

Establishment of the territory and provisional government

In January 1947, the United Nations Security Council approved Resolution 16 under Article 24 of its charter calling for the creation of a free state in Trieste and the region surrounding it. A permanent statute codifying its provisions was to become recognized under international law upon the appointment of an international governor approved by the Quatripartite Powers. On 15 September 1947, the peace treaty between the United Nations (UN) and Italy was ratified, establishing the Free Territory of Trieste. Official languages were Italian and Slovene, possibly with the use of Serbo-Croatian in the portion of Zone B south of the Dragonja River.

Between October 1947 and March 1948, the Soviet Union rejected the candidacy of 12 nominations for governor, at which point the Tripartite Powers (United States, United Kingdom, and France) issued a note to the Soviet and Yugoslav governments on 20 March 1948 recommending that the territory be returned to Italian sovereignty. No governor was ever appointed under the terms of Resolution 16. The Territory thus never functioned as a real independent state, although its formal status was generally respected and it was involved in the European Recovery Program (ERP) and in the OEEC. The Tito-Stalin split in mid-1948 resulted in the proposal to return the territory to Italy being suspended until 1954.

The Allied Military Government administered Zone A, which was divided into peacekeeping and law enforcement sectors protected by a command of 5,000 Americans ("TRUST", the Trieste United States Troops) and 5,000 British in "BETFOR" (British Element Trieste FORce), each comprising a brigade-sized infantry force and complete support units (signals, engineers, military police, etc.)

According to the estimates published by the Allied Military Government, as of 1949 in Zone A there were about 310,000 inhabitants, including 239,200 Italians and 63,000 Slovenes. According to contemporary Italian sources, in Zone B there were 36,000 to 55,000 Italians and 12,000 to 17,000 Slovenes and Croats. According to the Yugoslav census of 1945, which was considered falsified by the Quadripartite Commission set up by the UN, in the part of Istria which was to become Zone B there were 67,461 inhabitants, including 30,789 Slovenes, Serbs and Croats, 29,672 Italians, and 7,000 people of unidentified nationality.
Elections were held twice, in 1949 and 1952, but only for municipal councils, never for the FTT People's Assembly (FTT legislature).

Dissolution
On 5 October 1954, the London Memorandum was signed in the British capital by ministers of the United States, United Kingdom, Italy, and Yugoslavia. It gave the former Zone A with Trieste to Italy for ordinary civil administration, and Zone B, which had already had a communist government since 1947, to Yugoslavia. In addition, Yugoslavia was given the area containing the city of Koper (Koppe) in Zone A, as well as  several villages in the municipality of Muggia that had been part of Zone A: Plavje, Spodnje Škofije, Elerji, Hrvatini, Kolomban, Cerej, Premančan, and Barizoni. The castle and village of Socerb above San Dorligo della Valle was also ceded to the Yugoslav administration, according to the demarcation line defined by Annex I to the London Memorandum.

In 1975, the bilateral Treaty of Osimo was signed and ratified two years later, definitively stopping respective claims over the former Free Territory of Trieste by Italy and Yugoslavia, as the London Memorandum only disestablished the territory de facto, but not de jure.

Governors of the territory

Zone A

Military commander

Zone B

Military commander 

*Governors of all Julian March prior to the establishment of the Territory.

Economics
The economy of the territory was based on its ports, namely the Free Port of Trieste and the Port of Koper/Capodistria. The first had a peculiar free zone (nowadays also offshore) status originated in 1719 and confirmed by the Treaty of Peace with Italy of 1947, which allows the transportation of goods inside the area.
This status is recognised by the international community and the European Union.

An excerpt from the answer given by Algirdas Šemeta on 7 August 2012, on behalf of the European Commission about the Free Port of Trieste:
Annex VIII to the Treaty of peace with Italy of 10 February 1947 stipulates in its Article 1 that the port of Trieste shall be a customs-free port. Article 5(2) of Annex VIII provides that in connection with the importation into or exportation from or transit through the Free Port, the authorities of the Free Territory shall not levy on such goods customs duties or charges other than those levied for services rendered. [emphasis added]

Demographics 
During the late 1940s and in the years following the division of the territory, up to 40,000 people (mostly Italians) chose to leave the Yugoslav Zone B and move to the Italian Zone A for various reasons: some were intimidated into leaving, and some simply preferred not to live in Yugoslavia. (See Italianization that occurred previously.) Within Yugoslavia, the people who left were referred to as  'choosers', whereas they called themselves  'exiles'. About 14,000 Italians chose to remain in the Yugoslav zone. The population of the Free Territory of Trieste was approximately 370,000 in 1949.

See also 
 Treaty of Peace with Italy, 1947
 Communist Party of the Free Territory of Trieste
 United Nations Security Council Resolution 16
 Julian March
 Istrian–Dalmatian exodus
 Morgan Line
 Slovene Littoral
 Province of Trieste
 List of governors of the Province of Trieste
 Triestine Serbs
 Slovenian Istria
 Istria County

References

External links 

 Vintage Life Magazine Photos of Trieste at Google Images.
 http://www.securitycouncilreport.org/atf/cf/%7B65BFCF9B-6D27-4E9C-8CD3-CF6E4FF96FF9%7D/s_2015_809.pdf

 
City-states
Allied occupation of Europe
Italy–Yugoslavia relations
Aftermath of World War II
1947 establishments in Europe
1954 disestablishments in Europe
States and territories established in 1947
States and territories disestablished in 1954